The Ensign-Bickford Aerospace & Defense Company (formerly The Ensign-Bickford Company) is a manufacturer of hardware and energetic systems for use in spacecraft, military, and industrial applications. It is a wholly owned subsidiary of Ensign-Bickford Industries.

History 
The Ensign-Bickford Company (EBCo) was started in 1836 in Simsbury, Connecticut as a manufacturer of William Bickford's safety fuse for use in mining. Safety fuse was a great advance in mining technology over the practice of filling holes with black powder.

The next step in mining technology was detonating cord. Ensign-Bickford and other companies developed different versions of detonating cord. In 1937, Ensign-Bickford trademarked "Primacord", which became the functional generic name for detonating cord in North America. In May 2003, Ensign-Bickford sold the trademarks and processes to Dyno Nobel Inc  of Australia (formerly of Norway).

In 1956, EBCo began providing research and development work for Frankford Arsenal and Sandia National Laboratories to develop linear shaped charge, a product critical to the early strategic missile and launch vehicle programs. In 1965, the Space Ordnance Division was formed, making contributions to early NASA programs such as Mercury, Gemini, and Apollo. In 1987, the Space Ordnance Division became Ensign-Bickford Aerospace Company, a wholly owned subsidiary of EBCo, later becoming The Ensign-Bickford Aerospace & Defense Company.

Locations 
In addition to its headquarters and manufacturing operations in Simsbury, Connecticut,  EBAD has facilities in Graham, Kentucky,  Moorpark and San Rafael, California.

Acquisitions

References

External links 
 Corporate website
 The Talk of Simsbury: Ensign Bickford Industries - Interview with Tom Perlitz, President and CEO of Ensign Bickford Industries, Inc.

Simsbury, Connecticut
Manufacturing companies based in Connecticut
Explosives manufacturers
Companies based in Hartford County, Connecticut